Bernhard "Bernd" Georg Josef Förster (born 3 May 1956) is a former German footballer who played as a defender and midfielder.

His younger brother, Karlheinz, was also a footballer, and a defender. Both played extensively at VfB Stuttgart, and were crowned European champions in 1980.

Club career
Förster started playing professionally at SV Waldhof Mannheim, in the second division. In January 1975, he switched to country giants FC Bayern Munich, but his stay there was highly unsuccessful (he did appear twice in the club's 1975–76 European Cup victorious campaign).

After establishing himself in the top flight with 1. FC Saarbrücken, Förster switched to VfB Stuttgart, after his former club relegated. He became an essential defensive member in the following seasons, partnering sibling Karlheinz in the back-four. Until his retirement, Förster scored 25 goals in 291 overall top-division league matches, being instrumental in Stuttgart's 1984 national league (31 matches, two goals). He retired in 1986, at only 30.

International career
Förster won his first cap for West Germany on 22 May 1979, in a 3–1 friendly win in Republic of Ireland. In the following year's UEFA European Football Championship, he played twice as the nation was crowned continental champions, alongside brother Karlheinz.

At the 1982 FIFA World Cup, Förster only started playing in the second group stage, but from then on played the entire matches en route to the vice-championship. Hence, the pair became the first brothers in German football history to take part in a World Cup final since Ottmar and Fritz Walter's appearances in the victorious 1954 edition, and the first to be defeated.

Förster retired from international play after UEFA Euro 1984 in France, as Germany were ousted from the group stage after a last-minute goal by Spain's Antonio Maceda. He gained a total of 33 caps.

Honours

Club
Bayern Munich
 European Cup: 1974–75, 1975–76
 Intercontinental Cup: 1976

VfB Stuttgart
 Bundesliga: 1983–84
 DFB-Pokal runner-up: 1985–86

International
West Germany
UEFA European Championship: 1980
FIFA World Cup runner-up: 1982

References

External links
 
 
 

1956 births
Living people
German footballers
Association football defenders
Bundesliga players
2. Bundesliga players
SV Waldhof Mannheim players
FC Bayern Munich footballers
1. FC Saarbrücken players
VfB Stuttgart players
Germany international footballers
Germany B international footballers
Germany youth international footballers
UEFA Euro 1980 players
1982 FIFA World Cup players
UEFA Euro 1984 players
UEFA European Championship-winning players
West German footballers